Joshua Lee Haynes (born July 30, 1977) is an American former mixed martial artist. He fought out of Las Vegas, Nevada, with Xtreme Couture where he was also a coach. His MMA record is 17 wins, 11 losses. He was also a contestant on the third season of The Ultimate Fighter reality television show, training under Tito Ortiz. Fellow Team Quest member, Ed Herman would fight under Ken Shamrock's team. In The Ultimate Fighter, he won a controversial victory against Tait Fletcher by decision after the second round. In the semifinals, he defeated Jesse Forbes by guillotine choke in the second round. He was defeated by Michael Bisping in the finals due to strikes.

Personal information
Haynes was born in Grants Pass, Oregon. He has a bachelor's degree in Computer Information Systems from Southern Oregon University in Ashland, Oregon.

Haynes is currently a police officer in Las Vegas since retiring from MMA according to MMA Insight.

Haynes was on duty during the 2017 Las Vegas shooting. Haynes saved a rookie officer's life, who had been shot in the shoulder, which lodged in his chest, by getting him out of the area, while under fire, and driving him to the hospital, as it was not possible to get an ambulance to the scene. Both he and the wounded officer were visited by President Donald Trump, along with other victims. Haynes later issues a statement, where he detailed the incident from his perspective and expressed condolences to other victims.

Mixed martial arts record

|-
| Loss
| align=center| 17–11
| Eliot Marshall
| Decision (unanimous)
| ROF 39 - Summer Brawl 2
| 
| align=center| 3
| align=center| 5:00
| Denver, Colorado, United States
| 
|-
| Win
| align=center| 17–10
| Rafael del Real
| Decision (split)
| WarGods/Ken Shamrock Productions: Valentine's Eve Massacre
| 
| align=center| 3
| align=center| 5:00
| Fresno, California, United States
| 
|-
| Win
| align=center| 16–10
| Sean Salmon
| Submission (achilles lock)
| SuperFights MMA - Night of Combat 2
| 
| align=center| 2
| align=center| 2:49
| Las Vegas, Nevada, United States
| 
|-
| Loss
| align=center| 15–10
| Mojo Horne
| Decision (unanimous)
| MMA BigShow
| 
| align=center| 3
| align=center| 5:00
| Belterra, Indiana, United States
| 
|-
| Win
| align=center| 15–9
| Leopoldo Serao
| Decision (unanimous)
| IFL – Las Vegas
| 
| align=center| 3
| align=center| 5:00
| Las Vegas, Nevada, United States
| 
|-
| Loss
| align=center| 14–9
| Cedric Marks
| KO (strikes)
| XFC Battlegrounds
| 
| align=center| 3
| 
| San Antonio, Texas, United States
| 
|-
| Win
| align=center| 14–8
| Steve Heath
| KO
| WC – Warrior Cup
| 
| align=center| 1
| align=center| N/A
| Stockton, California, United States
| 
|-
| Win
| align=center| 13–8
| John Cornett
| KO (punch)
| IFO: Kimmons vs. Yunker
| 
| align=center| 3
| align=center| 2:37
| Las Vegas, Nevada, United States
| 
|-
| Loss
| align=center| 12–8
| Luke Cummo
| KO (punch)
| UFC 69
| 
| align=center| 2
| align=center| 2:45
| Houston, Texas, United States
| 
|-
| Loss
| align=center| 12–7
| Rory Singer
| Decision (unanimous)
| Ortiz vs. Shamrock 3: The Final Chapter
| 
| align=center| 3
| align=center| 5:00
| Hollywood, Florida, United States
| 
|-
| Loss
| align=center| 12–6
| Michael Bisping
| TKO (strikes)
| The Ultimate Fighter: Team Ortiz vs. Team Shamrock Finale
| 
| align=center| 2
| align=center| 4:14
| Las Vegas, Nevada, United States
| 
|-
| Win
| align=center| 12–5
| Seth Kleinbeck
| Submission (rear naked choke)
| FFC 15 – Fiesta Las Vegas
| 
| align=center| 2
| align=center| 1:16
| Las Vegas, Nevada, United States
| 
|-
| Loss
| align=center| 11–5
| Shonie Carter
| Decision (unanimous)
| IFC – Rock N'Rumble
| 
| align=center| 3
| align=center| 5:00
| Reno, Nevada, United States
| 
|-
| Loss
| align=center| 11–4
| Horace Spencer
| TKO (referee stoppage)
| DB 14 – Desert Brawl 14
| 
| align=center| 1
| 
| Bend, Oregon, United States
| 
|-
| Win
| align=center| 11–3
| Delon Williams
| Submission (guillotine choke)
| SF 11 – Rumble at the Rose Garden
| 
| align=center| 2
| align=center| 2:39
| Portland, Oregon, United States
| 
|-
| Win
| align=center| 10–3
| Marcos Oliveira
| Submission (guillotine choke)
| XFC – Dome of Destruction 1
| 
| align=center| 1
| align=center| 3:21
| Tacoma, Washington, United States
| 
|-
| Win
| align=center| 9–3
| Carlos Garcia
| TKO
| UCF: Festival of Freaks
| 
| align=center| N/A
| 
| Oregon, United States
| 
|-
| Win
| align=center| 8–3
| Jake Villanueva
| KO
| UCF: Holiday Massacre
| 
| align=center| N/A
| 
| Medford, Oregon, United States
| 
|-
| Loss
| align=center| 7–3
| Vince Lucero
| Submission (rear naked choke)
| LOTC – Lords of the Cage
| 
| align=center| 2
| align=center| 2:08
| Anacortes, Washington, United States
| 
|-
| Loss
| align=center| 7–2
| Jerry Vrbanovic
| Decision
| ROTR – Rage on the River
| 
| align=center| 3
| align=center| 3:00
| Redding, California, United States
| 
|-
| Win
| align=center| 7–1
| Kyle Kenny
| Submission (guillotine choke)
| USA MMA – Extreme Cage Combat
| 
| align=center| 1
| 
| Shelton, Washington, United States
| 
|-
| Win
| align=center| 6–1
| Dave Hagen
| Submission
| FCFF – Rumble at the Roseland 10
| 
| align=center| 1
| align=center| 0:32
| Portland, Oregon, United States
| 
|-
| Win
| align=center| 5–1
| Trent Standing
| TKO
| FCFF – Rumble at the Roseland 9
| 
| align=center| 2
| align=center| 4:36
| Portland, Oregon, United States
| 
|-
| Win
| align=center| 4–1
| Jim Pope
| Submission (guillotine choke)
| URC 4 – Ultimate Ring Challenge
| 
| align=center| 1
| align=center| 0:34
| Kelso, Washington, United States
| 
|-
| Win
| align=center| 3–1
| Jordan Ramos
| TKO
| Xtreme Ring Wars
| 
| align=center| 1
| align=center| N/A
| Wenatchee, Washington, United States
| 
|-
| Win
| align=center| 2–1
| Karl Pope
| Submission
| FCFF: Fight Night 2
| 
| align=center| N/A
| 
| Medford, Oregon, United States
| 
|-
| Win
| align=center| 1–1
| Josh Bennett
| Submission
| FCFF – Rumble at the Roseland 4
| 
| align=center| 2
| align=center| 0:43
| Oregon, United States
| 
|-
| Loss
| align=center| 0–1
| Larry Vandervort
| TKO
| FCFF – Rumble at the Roseland 3
| 
| align=center| N/A
| 
| Oregon, United States
|

References

External links
 
 
 MMA record on Full Contact Fighter
 Xtreme Fight Championship

1977 births
American male mixed martial artists
Mixed martial artists from Oregon
Living people
Sportspeople from Grants Pass, Oregon
Welterweight mixed martial artists
Southern Oregon University alumni
Ultimate Fighting Championship male fighters